Heather Christina Marie Matarazzo (born November 10, 1982) is an American actress. Her breakthrough role was Dawn Wiener in the film Welcome to the Dollhouse (1995). She played Lilly in The Princess Diaries (2001) and The Princess Diaries 2: Royal Engagement (2004). Her other films include The Devil's Advocate (1997), Scream 3 (2000), Sorority Boys (2002), Saved! (2004), Hostel 2 (2007) and Scream (2022).

Early life 
Matarazzo's biological mother was Irish American and her biological father was from Knock, County Mayo. She was adopted and raised by the Matarazzos, an Italian American family.

Career 
Matarazzo began acting at the age of six; after commandeering the microphone at an AIDS benefit for children, she was given the card of a talent manager, with whom she remained for 10 years.

In 1997, she won an Independent Spirit Award for her performance as adolescent social outcast Dawn Wiener in Welcome to the Dollhouse. Matarazzo has expressed pleasure in being allowed to play interesting characters, some of whom "are ostracized for various reasons." She has commented that she is most proud of her performance in 1999's Our Guys: Outrage in Glen Ridge, based on a true story, in which she played a mentally challenged girl who is raped by football players. In 1999 to 2000 she portrayed Heather Wiseman in the short-lived TV series, Now and Again. In 2000 she appeared in the teen romantic comedy film The Princess Diaries as Lilly Moscovitz and reprised her role in the 2004 sequel The Princess Diaries 2: Royal Engagement.

Matarazzo has made appearances on several hit TV shows including Roseanne, Law & Order, The L Word, Greys Anatomy and Strangers With Candy. Matarazzo starred opposite Thaao Penghlis in the world premiere of Charles Evered's play Class at Cape May Stage in Cape May, New Jersey in May and June 2010.

In 2011, Matarazzo announced that she would begin working on her directorial debut, a television series to be based on a memoir by author Diane Hanks, titled Summer Camp: A Memoir.

Personal life 
In 2004, at the age of 21, Matarazzo came out as a lesbian in an article in the New York Daily News, and was subsequently profiled in an article in the October 2004 edition of The Advocate. On July 31, 2008, Matarazzo's publicist announced that Matarazzo was engaged to musician Caroline Murphy. In 2012, popular media news outlets announced that Matarazzo and Murphy had split amicably. Matarazzo married comedian Heather Turman in 2018.

Matarazzo revealed she was scheduled to attend a meeting on the 15th floor of the World Trade Center on September 11, 2001, shortly after the attacks occurred, but overslept.

Matarazzo endorsed and actively campaigned for Senator Bernie Sanders for President in the 2016 U.S. presidential election.

Filmography

Film

Television

References

External links 

Heather Matarazzo at Rotten Tomatoes
Heather Matarazzo Website at WordPress.com

Living people
20th-century American actresses
21st-century American actresses
Actresses from New York (state)
American adoptees
American child actresses
American film actresses
American lesbian actresses
American people of Irish descent
American stage actresses
American television actresses
Independent Spirit Award winners
People from Oyster Bay (town), New York
LGBT people from New York (state)
1982 births